Peroxisomal biogenesis factor 3 is a protein that in humans is encoded by the PEX3 gene.

Interactions 

PEX3 has been shown to interact with PEX19.

References

Further reading

External links 
  GeneReviews/NCBI/NIH/UW entry on Peroxisome Biogenesis Disorders, Zellweger Syndrome Spectrum
 OMIM entries on Peroxisome Biogenesis Disorders, Zellweger Syndrome Spectrum